"United/Zyklon B Zombie" is the debut single by industrial band Throbbing Gristle. It was released in 7" vinyl format in May 1978, through the band's own Industrial Records.

Background 

The single's A-side, "United", was called "one of the first electropop singles" by Jon Savage., while the B-side, "Zyklon B Zombie", has been seen as a parody of punk rock music. "United" featured a minimal drum loop and synthesizer pattern with uncharacteristically positive lyrics, while "Zyklon B Zombie" featured little more than growling, distorted vocals and bass guitar with a frenetic guitar solo. Both tracks were later released in the CD version of The Second Annual Report.

Release 

The original pressing by Industrial Records had its own unique Label and Logo. After approximately 20,000 sales, re-pressing was taken over by Rough Trade and the single was re-cut with different messages ('Salon Kitty' on side B and '437 666 OTO' 'RE-CUT 4 Nov 79' and '20,000 DOWN' on side A). This version's "Zyklon B Zombie" with Cosey Fanni Tutti's guitar was much louder compared to the original version, being an improvement over the original. This version still had the same Label as the original pressing, bearing no difference in that regard.

A third pressing was in white vinyl (1,000 copies) and clear vinyl (1,000 copies) and features around two minutes of rain and train sounds at the end of side two.

"United" made an appearance in Throbbing Gristle's second studio album D.o.A: The Third and Final Report of Throbbing Gristle as a 16-second sped-up version.

Track listing

Personnel 

Peter Christopherson
Cosey Fanni Tutti
Francky Vincent
Chris Carter
Genesis P-Orridge

Charts

References

External links 

 

Throbbing Gristle songs
1978 debut singles
Post-punk songs